The Lakeshore Corridor is the area around the Edens Expressway and Tri-State Tollway, in the northern suburbs of Chicago, including the affluent North Shore suburbs. It is home to many shopping centers, healthcare facilities, hotels, and other amenities.

Cities and villages 
 Lincolnwood
 Evanston
 Skokie
 Glenview
 Wilmette
 Kenilworth
 Winnetka
 Northfield
 Glencoe
 Northbrook
 Highland Park
 Deerfield
 Highwood
 Wheeling
 Buffalo Grove
 Lincolnshire
 Riverwoods
 Vernon Hills
 Mundelein
 Lake Forest
 Mettawa
 Green Oaks
 Libertyville
 Lake Bluff
 North Chicago
 Waukegan
 Park City
 Gurnee
 Hawthorn Woods

Shopping Centers 
 Westfield Old Orchard
 Northbrook Court
 Deerbrook Mall
 Lincolnshire Commons
 Hawthorn Mall
 Gurnee Mills
 Downtown Waukegan
 Downtown Highland Park
 Downtown Evanston

Transportation 
 Interstate 94 connects the region to Chicago and Milwaukee, north of Lake Cook Road as the Tri-State Tollway and south of Lake Cook Road primarily as the Edens Expressway.
 U.S. Route 41 connects the region to Chicago and Milwaukee, in Lincolnwood, Skokie, and Wilmette as Lincoln Avenue and Skokie Boulevard, as the Edens Expressway between Wilmette and Highland Park, and as Skokie Highway between Highland Park and just a mile south of the Wisconsin border, where it merges again with I-94.
 Interstate 294 connects the region to O'Hare, the western suburbs, the southwest suburbs, the south suburbs, and most of the other expressways that access Chicago.

See also 
 Golden Corridor
 Illinois Technology & Research Corridor

Geography of Lake County, Illinois
Geography of Cook County, Illinois